Belshaw is a surname of French origin.

Origins and variants 
One theory suggests that the surname, which made its first recorded appearance in the 13th Century, is French in origin and related to the nickname meaning cheerful, or good looking, derived from the Old French beu and bel, meaning fair and lovely and chere, meaning face.

Variants of the surname include "Belsher", "Beuscher", "Beaushaw", "Bewshire", "Bewshaw", "Bewshea", "Beushaw" and "Bowsher".

People with the surname 
Billy Belshaw, English rugby league footballer of the 1930s and 1940s
Cyril Belshaw (1921–2018), New Zealand-born anthropologist
Horace Belshaw (1898–1962), New Zealand teacher, economist and professor
Les Belshaw, English rugby league footballer
Scott Belshaw (born 1985), Northern Ireland professional boxer

References

Surnames of French origin